Albion railway station is located on the North Coast line in Queensland, Australia. It serves the Brisbane suburb of Albion. On 29 November 1999, two extra platforms opened as part of the quadruplication of the line from Bowens Hills to Northgate.

Services
Albion station is served daily by the Airport, Doomben and Shorncliffe lines. Also see Inner City timetable

Services by Platform

References

External links
 
 Albion station Queensland Rail
 Albion station Queensland's Railways on the Internet
 [ Albion station] TransLink travel information

Railway stations in Brisbane
North Coast railway line, Queensland